Birgit Heeb-Batliner (born 14 October 1972) is a Liechtensteiner former alpine skier who competed in the 1992 Winter Olympics, 1994 Winter Olympics, 1998 Winter Olympics, and 2002 Winter Olympics. She scored one alpine skiing World Cup win in her career, in a giant slalom race in Park City, Utah in November 2002.

References

External links
 sports-reference.com

1972 births
Living people
Liechtenstein female alpine skiers
Olympic alpine skiers of Liechtenstein
Alpine skiers at the 1992 Winter Olympics
Alpine skiers at the 1994 Winter Olympics
Alpine skiers at the 1998 Winter Olympics
Alpine skiers at the 2002 Winter Olympics